The 2003–04 Ekstraklasa is the 78th season of the Polish Football Championship and the 70th season of the Ekstraklasa, the top Polish professional league for association football clubs, since its establishment in 1927.

Overview
14 teams competed in the 2003-04 season. Wisła Kraków won the championship.

League table

Results

Relegation playoffs 
The matches were played on 19 and 26 June 2004.

Top goalscorers

References

Ekstraklasa seasons
Poland
1